A Distant Shore is the seventh novel by Black British author Caryl Phillips, published in 2003 by Secker & Warburg in the UK and Knopf in the US. It was a finalist for the 2003 PEN/Faulkner Award. In the 2004 Commonwealth Writers' Prize it won the Best Book Prize in the Europe and South Asia category and was judged that year's overall Best Book.

Set in contemporary England, A Distant Shore is the story of an African man and an English woman "whose hidden lives, and worlds, are revealed in their fragile, fateful connection". As the author has stated: "It is obviously a novel about the challenged identity of two individuals, but it's also a novel about English—or national—identity."

References

Further reading
David Ellis, "'They are us': Caryl Phillips’ A Distant Shore and the British transnation", The Journal of Commonwealth Literature, September 2013, vol. 48, no. 3 411-423.

External links
 Natasha Walter, "The sadness of strangers" (review), The Guardian, 15 March 2003.
 Rand Richards Cooper, "There's No Place That's Home", The New York Times, 19 October 2003.

2003 British novels
English novels
Secker & Warburg books
PEN/Faulkner Award for Fiction-winning works